Hedley Bailey (25 June 1895–1968) was an English footballer who played in the Football League for Rotherham County and Rotherham United.

References

1895 births
1968 deaths
English footballers
Association football midfielders
English Football League players
Rotherham County F.C. players
Rotherham United F.C. players
Scunthorpe United F.C. players